Carl Allen may refer to:

Carl Allen (cornerback) (born 1955), American football player
Carl Allen (tailback) (1920–2008), American football player
Carl Allen (drummer) (born 1961), jazz drummer
Carl Ferdinand Allen (1811–1871), Danish historian
Carl Meredith Allen, associated with the Philadelphia Experiment